"Military Drums" is a song by German synthpop band Hubert Kah, released in 1987 as a non-album single.

In 1987, "Military Drums" was added as the opening track on a "special edition" Germany-only reissue of the band's 1986 album Tensongs. The song was also included on the US and Japanese editions of the band's 1989 album Sound of My Heart. In 2005, Hubert Kemmler re-recorded the song for the sixth Hubert Kah album, Seelentaucher.

Background
Speaking of the song, Hirschburger recalled to James Arena in 2017: "[It was written] in about 10 minutes in Ibiza feeling very jet lagged. We added trumpets, recorded it in about five hours and launched it as a single." The song features Carol Kenyon on backing vocals.

"Military Drums" was the band's first single to enter the US Billboard Hot Dance Music Club Play chart, peaking at No. 8 in November 1987. It was also the band's last Top 40 hit in Germany, reaching No. 35.

Promotion
The song's music video was directed by Rudi Dolezal and Hannes Rossacher of DoRo Productions. On its release, Rossacher described the video as "slightly avant-garde". The video makes the use of speed manipulation which was achieved by shooting the video on six frames per second. On German TV, the band performed the song on ZDF-Hitparade on 20 August 1987.

Critical reception
Upon its release, Billboard described the song as a "Euro-influenced techno number".

Track listing
7" single
"Military Drums" - 3:41
"Explain the World in a Word" - 4:11

12" single (European release)
"Military Drums" (Extended Version) - 6:27
"Explain the World in a Word" - 4:11

12" single (US release)
"Military Drums" (Extended Version) - 6:27
"Military Drums" - 3:41
"Explain the World in a Word" - 4:11

12" single (US promo)
"Military Drums" (Extended Version) - 6:27
"Military Drums" (Edited Version) - 3:14
"Military Drums" - 3:41

12" single (US promo #2)
"Military Drums" (Crossover Radio Edit) - 3:50
"Military Drums" (Powermix) - 5:20
"Military Drums" (LP Edit Version) - 3:14
"Military Drums" (Dance Edit By Ali Lexa) - 6:50

CD single (German release)
"Military Drums" (Extended Version) - 6:27
"Explain the World in a Word" - 4:11
"Military Drums" (7" Version) - 3:41

CD single (German release #2)
"Military Drums" (Extended Version) - 6:27
"Explain the World in a Word" - 4:11
"Limousine" (Extended Version) - 5:40
"Something I Should Know" (Remix Version) - 3:27
"Military Drums" (Video Version) - 3:38

Personnel
Hubert Kah
 Hubert Kemmler – vocals
 Markus Löhr – guitar, keyboards
 Klaus Hirschburger – bass
 Carol Kenyon – backing vocals

Production
 Michael Cretu,  – producers
 Boris Granich, Christer Modig – remixers on "Crossover Radio Edit" and "Powermix"
 Ali Lexa - remixer on "Dance Edit By Ali Lexa"

Other
 Mike Schmidt at Ink Studios – cover
 Dieter Eikelpoth – photography

Charts

References

Songs about the military
Songs about drums
1987 songs
1987 singles
Curb Records singles
Songs written by Michael Cretu
Song recordings produced by Michael Cretu